Kathanayakan is a 1997 Indian Malayalam-language family drama film directed by Rajasenan. The film stars Kalamandalam Kesavan, Jayaram, Divya Unni and Oduvil Unnikrishnan. It was reported to have been inspired by the 1994 movie Greedy. It was remade by Telugu as Pandaga.This film was a commercial success.

Plot
Payyarathu Padmanabhan Nair, who is a well known personality is praised by the people. He lives precedent life with his whole family members (Kootukudumbam), his friend Reeve Sankunni and servant, Kuttan. He loves his family more than his life, but they all have eyes on his wealth. On the day of his niece Meenakshi's wedding day, he meets with a young man Ramanathan. Ramanathan befriends him and Padmanabhan Nair likes Ramanathan's qualities. It is later revealed that Ramanathan is the son of Padmanabhan Nair and Sankunni's younger sister Saudamini. Slowly Ramanathan gets into the family to stay with his father. There he clashes with Payyarathu Padmanabhan Nair's niece and his cousin Gopika and she dislikes him as the other family members too. The men of the family sell the kitchen's rice and other goods without Padmanabhan Nair's knowledge. Ramanathan and Sankunni come know about this. They try to prevent this action. The family members reveal the truth to Padmanabhan Nair that Ramanathan is Sankunni's nephew and they are thrown out of the house. Later Padmanabhan Nair asks Sankunni 'Who is Ramanathan?' and Sankunni reveals the truth. Padmanabhan Nair rushes to his son and hugs him. But he is in a dilemma that he wants to accept his son but can't reveal the truth to the family to save his reputation. The hurt Ramanathan challenges his father to accept him and tell the truth to the whole family.

Ramanathan and Sankunni return to the family. The whole family wants to know why they have returned. Padmanabhan Nair doesn't answer their questions. Gopika decides to leave the house and stay in hostel. Ramanathan stops her and she insults him. Ramanathan slaps her and she cries and runs off. In the night, Padmanabhan Nair comes to his son who is sleeping and tries to stroke him. But he get back and returns from there. Gopika notices this. Next day every man goes to work in their own vehicles. Ramanathan stops them and gets them into a van. Ramanathan slowly takes the control of the family and the whole family hates this. Padmanabhan Nair tells Sankunni that he can't take the dilemma. Sankunni tells Ramanathan to go from the family. Ramanathan tells him that he wants to protect his father from the greedy family members. Sankunni tells his father that he doesn't want his presence. Ramanathan decides to go and Gopika, who has overheard the truth, stops him. She tells them he shouldn't go and she is with him. Ramanathan and Kuttan go to Beerankutty, to whom the family's men sold the goods, and tells him Padmanabhan Nair wants to sell the whole goods of kitchen to him. Believing this, Beerankutty comes to Payyarathu home to see Padmanabhan Nair. The family men see him and are fearful. They try to prevent him and Padmanabhan Nair stops them. Beerankutty reveals the truth and Kuttan also admits it. The family men apologize and Padmanabhan Nair leaves in anger. The family wants to celebrate Padmanabhan Nair's 'Sapthathi' (70th birthday) so that he has to hand over his power. Gopika tells this to Ramanathan. Padmanabhan Nair objects to the family's request. Ramanathan reveals the news in a newspaper. Padmanabhan Nair is angry at him. The village people come and tell Padmanabhan Nair it's their right to celebrate this with the family and they decide to celebrate. On the celebration day, Ramanathan tells his father that he always said "tell the truth" and now he has to reveal the truth. Padmanabhan Nair reveals the truth about his son to all. Angered, family members beat Ramanathan and demands Padmanabhan Nair their shares. Padmanabhan Nair willingly accepts their demand. On the share day, the family members want to know whose name the home is in and beat the advocate. They receive a phone call saying that the whole foundations of Payyarath family have been raided and manager Krishna Menon comes and reveals that Padmanabhan Nair didn't pay the taxes so the raid happens. The family learn that they will not get any shares. They ran and stole everything from the home and left. Gopika says to Ramanathan that everyone has gone, leaving her alone and Ramanathan holds her hand. Ramanathan, Gopika and Kuttan searches for Padmanabhan Nair. They find him in a charity home. Ramanathan and Gopika ask him to return. He asks them if they can give him his past life. Ramanathan tells he can't but he can work hard for it. It was revealed that no raid occurred. It was his plan to know who is honest. He leaves with them to bring Saudaminiyamma back as his wife. They reach Ramanathan's home and it is revealed that Saudaminiyamma is dead and Ramanathan says that he promised his mother at his deathbed to bring his father to light her pyre. Heartbroken, Padmanabhan Nair lights her pyre. Padmanabhan Nair lives his later life happily with his son Ramanathan, niece Gopika, Sankunni and Kuttan.

Cast

Kalamandalam Kesavan as Payyarathu Padmanabhan Nair
Jayaram as Ramanathan, as Sankunni Nair's nephew and Padmanabhan Nair's son
Oduvil Unnikrishnan as Sankunni Nair, Padmanabhan Nair's best friend and confidant
Divya Unni as Gopika aka Gopu, Padmanabhan Nair's niece
Kalabhavan Mani as Kuttan
K. P. A. C. Lalitha as Kunjulakshmi Amma, the eldest among Padmanabhan Nair's younger sisters
Cherthala Lalitha as Karthiyani, the third sister of Padmanabhan Nair
Zeenath as Ammutty, Padmanabhan Nair's Youngest sister
K. T. S. Padannayil as Konthunni Nair, Karthiyani's husband
Kochu Preman as Vamanan Namboothiri, Ammuty's husband
Paravoor Ramachandran as Sankarankutty Nair, elder son of Kunjulakshmi Amma, eldest nephew.
Janardanan as Sathrughnan Pillai, Meenakshi's husband
Indrans as Sreedharan, Padmanabhan Nair's son-in-law
V. K. Sreeraman as Madhavan Nair, Padmanabhan Nair's son-in-law
Eliyas Babu as Govindankutty Nair, Padmanabhan Nair's nephew
Bobby Kottarakkara as Sadasivan Nair, Padmanabhan Nair's son-in-law
Yavanika Gopalakrishnan as Padmanabhan Nair's nephew
Bindu Panicker as Meenakshi, Padmanabhan Nair's niece
Sona Nair as Family member
Kannur Sreelatha as Family member
Kalamandalam Geethanandan as Padmanabhan Nair's nephew
Bindu Ramakrishnan as Family Member
T. P. Madhavan as Krishna Menon, a manager
Mamukkoya as Beerankutty, a grocer

Soundtrack
The music was composed by Mohan Sithara.

References

External links
 
 

1997 films
1990s Malayalam-language films
Films scored by Mohan Sithara
Films directed by Rajasenan
Malayalam films remade in other languages
Films shot in Ottapalam
Films shot at Varikkasseri Mana